Probability is the measure of an event's likelihood.

Probability may also refer to:

 Probability theory, the branch of mathematics concerned with probability
 Probability function (disambiguation)
 Probability (moral theology), a theory in Catholic moral theology for answering questions in which one does not know how to act
 Probability (Law & Order: Criminal Intent episode), an episode in the second season of the police procedural television series Law & Order: Criminal Intent

See also 

 Probably (disambiguation)
 Improbable (company)